Gorki is a rural locality (a village) in Vtorovskoye Rural Settlement, Kameshkovsky District, Vladimir Oblast, Russia. The population was 61 as of 2010.

Geography 
Gorki is located 27 km southwest of Kameshkovo (the district's administrative centre) by road. Vorynino is the nearest rural locality.

References 

Rural localities in Kameshkovsky District